A statue of ice hockey player Luc Robitaille by artists Julie Rotblatt Amrany, Omri Amrany, and Itamar Amrany is installed outside Los Angeles' Crypto.com Arena, in the U.S. state of California. The bronze sculpture was unveiled in 2015.

References 

2015 establishments in California
2015 sculptures
Bronze sculptures in California
Monuments and memorials in Los Angeles
Outdoor sculptures in Greater Los Angeles
Sculptures of men in California
South Park (Downtown Los Angeles)
Statues in Los Angeles
Statues of sportspeople